Rostellariella delicatula, common name the delicate tibia, is a species of sea snail, a marine gastropod mollusk in the family Rostellariidae, the true conchs.

Description
The size of the shell varies between 45 mm and 110 mm.

Distribution
This marine species occurs from the Gulf of Aden and East Africa to Sumatra, Indonesia.

References

 Liverani V. (2014) The superfamily Stromboidea. Addenda and corrigenda. In: G.T. Poppe, K. Groh & C. Renker (eds), A conchological iconography. pp. 1–54, pls 131-164. Harxheim: Conchbooks.

External links
 

Rostellariidae
Gastropods described in 1881